The ISPS Handa World Invitational is a professional golf tournament on the European Tour, LPGA Tour and Ladies European Tour.

History
The event was created in 2019 and involved separate men's and women's events, both having the same prize money. The men's event featured on the Challenge Tour schedule. Jack Senior won the men's event in a playoff over Matthew Baldwin. Stephanie Meadow won the women's event, beating Charley Hull by one shot.

In 2021, the event returned and was elevated to European Tour status along with co-sanctioning by the LPGA Tour and the Ladies European Tour. Daniel Gavins won the men's tournament for his first European Tour win. Pajaree Anannarukarn won the women's tournament in a playoff over Emma Talley for her first LPGA Tour victory.

Similarly to 2021, the 2022 event again featured 132 men and 132 women for each championship. A cut to top 60 and ties after 36 holes (two rounds), then a second cut to top 35 and ties after 54 holes (three rounds). For the first two rounds, all players played one round on each course.

Winners

See also
Northern Ireland Open (golf)

Notes

References

External links
ISPS Handa World Invitational official website
Coverage on the European Tour's official site

Former Challenge Tour events
European Tour events
Golf tournaments in Northern Ireland
Sport in Ballymena
Recurring sporting events established in 2019